Badroon  is a village in the Doda district of the Jammu and Kashmir union territory of India.

References

Villages in Doda district

Chenab Valley